Tim Pollard (born 23 February 1964) is an English actor and entertainer who has been appearing and performing as Robin Hood in and around his home town of  Nottingham, England for over 30 years. He lives and works in the legendary city as well as representing it nationally and internationally in his position as Nottingham's Official Robin Hood.

Early years

Before his career as an actor, Pollard worked in the roleplaying and wargaming industry for many years as well as being a freelance graphic designer and illustrator. During this time, he became involved in Viking battle re-enactment and the first live-roleplaying company established in the UK, Treasure Trap (at Peckforton Castle in Cheshire), as well as performing with a number of local rock bands. He also studied medieval Japanese and 19th century South African history at SOAS, the prestigious School of Oriental and African Studies in London.

Robin Hood

As Nottingham's Official Robin Hood, Tim Pollard has represented the County and City of Nottingham nationally and internationally since 1996 – for example appearing in Chicago, Houston, Toronto and several times in New York City and Hameln, Germany (home of the famous Pied Piper with whom he keeps contact through their brotherhood Legion of Legends. He also performs regularly at Nottingham Castle's annual Robin Hood pageant and at medieval banquets, charity events and other shows throughout the Midlands.

Television
Tim Pollard has also choreographed fight scenes or played roles in Blue Peter, The Oxford Road Show, Blind Date, The Big Breakfast, Moll Flanders and Common As Muck. He appears regularly on local TV news and has also appeared as Robin Hood on TV shows such as Australia's Channel 9 'Getaway' travel show, 'Castles, Secrets and Legends' for the US Travel Channel and the BBC's 'Antiques Roadtrip'.

In his role as Official Robin Hood of Nottinghamshire, he has appeared  as an expert in local history  on the Travel Channel television show "Expedition Unknown" Season 2 episode 'The Real Robin Hood'.

Film

Tim Pollard has appeared as the narrator character 'Lord Victor Fleming' in the horror films Dracula's Orgy of the Damned and  Werewolf Massacre at Hell's Gate. Fleming is an expert in occult lore and a collector of tales of eldritch curiosity.

DVD/Music

In 1985 he was a featured part of the stage show performing with psychedelic prog-rock band Hawkwind on their Chronicle of the Black Sword tour, and can be seen on the live concert DVD The Chronicle of the Black Sword.

Gaming and role-playing

Pollard has also worked full and part-time in the gaming business since 1978. He was also employed in design at Games Workshop and Citadel Miniatures as a writer, editor, artist and art manager. He edited and produced the initial Flintloque line of table-top Napoleonic fantasy games for Alternative Armies, as well as co-writing the entry for Shaka Zulu in Steve Jackson Games GURPS Who's Who. He also contributed research on antique coins to the PC first-person action game The Operative: No One Lives Forever.

References

External links
 Nottingham city website
 Legion of Legends
 
 Robin Hood Photos
 Moll Flanders at www.imdb.com
 Dracula's Orgy of the Damned at www.imdb.com

1964 births
Living people
actors from Nottingham
English male actors
Game artists
Interactive fiction writers